The 1950 Currie Cup was the 23nd edition of the Currie Cup, the premier domestic rugby union competition in South Africa.

Fixtures and Results

Playoff match
Transvaal and Northern Transvaal ended level on 14 points each after beating all seven teams in the B Section. As a result, Transvaal and Northern Transvaal played off, Transvaal winning 17-9.

Final

See also

 Currie Cup

References

1950
1950 in South African rugby union
Currie